is a passenger railway station in the city of Isumi, Chiba Prefecture, Japan, operated by the third-sector railway operator Isumi Railway.

Lines

Station layout
Kuniyoshi Station has dual opposed side platforms serving two tracks. The station is unattended, although the station building houses a number of shops.

Platforms

Adjacent stations

History
Kuniyoshi Station opened on April 1, 1930, as a station on the Japanese Government Railway (JGR) Kihara Line. After World War II, the JGR became the Japanese National Railways (JNR). Scheduled freight operations were discontinued from October 1, 1974. With the division and privatization of the Japan National Railways on April 1, 1987, the station was acquired by the East Japan Railway Company. On March 24, 1988, the Kihara Line became the Isumi Railroad Isumi Line. In 2009, a new station building was completed.

Passenger statistics
In fiscal 2018, the station was used by an average of 132 passengers daily.

Surrounding area
Isumi City Hall Isumi Branch (formerly the Isumi Town Hall)
Isumi Municipal Kuniyoshi Elementary School
Isumi Municipal Kuniyoshi Junior High School
Chiba Prefectural School for the Physically and Mentally Handicapped

See also
 List of railway stations in Japan

References

External links

 Isumi Railway Company home page 

Railway stations in Japan opened in 1930
Railway stations in Chiba Prefecture
Isumi Line
Isumi